The terms genital modification and genital mutilation can refer to permanent or temporary changes to human sex organs. Some forms of genital alteration are performed on adults with their informed consent at their own behest, usually for aesthetic reasons or to enhance stimulation. However, other forms are performed on people who do not give informed consent, including infants or children. Any of these procedures may be considered modifications or mutilations in different cultural contexts and by different groups of people.

Reasons

Religious 
The vast majority of genital cutting in the world is done for religious motives (though not all members of genital cutting religions adhere to the practice). Genital cutting is performed for reasons such as:

 Rite of passage: circumcision in Islam is typically performed during childhood before puberty. In Judaism, the religious male circumcision ceremony is usually performed on infants 7 days old.
 Expression of religious identity: both in Judaism and Islam, genital cutting for males is seen as a practice that makes one part of the community.
 Attempt to repress sexual pleasure and desire: while this is explicitly recognized within Judaism, in the Muslim world, no such claims are made for male circumcision. However, many traditional cultures in East Africa and other Muslim jurisdictions have made such claims for female genital cutting.  This claim is currently very controversial with numerous research papers and fatawa (religious legal ruling) arguing over the permissibility and purpose of female genital cutting.

Body modification 

Many types of genital modification are performed at the behest of the individual, for personal, sexual, aesthetic or cultural reasons. Penile subincision, or splitting of the underside of the penis, is widespread in the traditional cultures of Indigenous Australians. This procedure has taken root in Western body modification culture, the modern primitives. Meatotomy is a form that involves splitting of the glans penis alone, while bisection is a more extreme form that splits the penis entirely in half.

Genital piercings and genital tattooing may be performed for aesthetic reasons, but piercings have the benefit of increasing sexual pleasure for the pierced individual or their sex partners.

Similarly, pearling involves surgical insertion of small, inert spheres under the skin along the shaft of the penis for the purpose of providing sexual stimulation to the walls of the vagina. Similar to tattooing, genital scarification is primarily done for aesthetic reasons by adding cosmetic scars to the skin. The genital decoration by scars is an ancient tradition in many cultures, both for men and women. The Hanabira-style (Japanese for petal) is a special form of scarification originating in Japan; it involves the decoration of the mons pubis.

Clitoris enlargement may be achieved temporarily through the use of a clitoral pump, or it may be achieved permanently through the application or injection of testosterone. Penis enlargement is a term for various techniques used to attempt to increase the size of the penis, though the safety and efficacy of these techniques are debated.

Voluntary sex reassignment

People who are transgender or intersex may undergo sex reassignment surgery to alter their bodies to match their gender identity. Not all transgender people elect to have these surgeries. Some of the surgical procedures are breast augmentation and vaginoplasty (creation of a vagina) for trans women and mastectomy (breast removal), metoidioplasty (elongation of the clitoris), and phalloplasty (creation of a penis) for trans men. Trans women may also benefit from hair removal and facial feminization surgery, while some trans men may have liposuction to remove fat deposits around their hips and thighs.

Hijra, a third gender found in the Indian subcontinent, may opt to undergo castration.

Involuntary sex assignment

Intersex children and children with ambiguous genitalia may be subjected to surgeries to "normalize" the appearance of their genitalia. These surgeries are usually performed for cosmetic benefit rather than for therapeutic reasons. Most surgeries involving children with ambiguous genitalia are sexually damaging and may render them infertile. For example, in cases involving male children with micropenis, doctors may recommend the child be reassigned as female. The Intersex Society of North America objects to elective surgeries performed on people without their informed consent on grounds that such surgeries subject patients to unnecessary harm and risk.

In some cases, a child's gender may be reassigned due to genital injury. There have been at least seven cases of unambiguously male infants being reassigned as female due to circumcision damaging their penises beyond repair, including David Reimer (born Bruce Reimer, later Brenda Reimer), who was the subject of John Money's John/Joan case.

As treatment
If the genitals become diseased, as in the case of cancer, sometimes the diseased areas are surgically removed. Females may undergo vaginectomy or vulvectomy (to the vagina and vulva, respectively), while males may undergo penectomy or orchiectomy (removal of the penis and testicles, respectively). Reconstructive surgery may be performed to restore what was lost, often with techniques similar to those used in sex reassignment surgery.

During childbirth, an episiotomy (cutting part of the tissue between the vagina and the anus) is sometimes performed to increase the amount of space through which the baby may emerge. Advocates of natural childbirth and unassisted birth state that this intervention is often performed without medical necessity, with significant damage to the female giving birth.

Hymenotomy is the surgical perforation of an imperforate hymen. It may be performed to allow menstruation to occur. An adult individual may opt for increasing the size of her hymenal opening, or removal of the hymen altogether, to facilitate sexual penetration of her vagina.

The world's first penis reduction surgery was performed in 2015, on a 17-year-old boy who had an American football-shaped penis as a result of recurrent priapism.

Self-inflicted

A person may engage in self-inflicted genital injury or mutilation such as castration, penectomy, or clitoridectomy. The motivation behind such actions vary widely; it may be done due to skoptic syndrome, personal crisis related to gender identity, mental illness, self-mutilation, body dysmorphia, or social reasons.

During armed conflict

Genital mutilation is common in some situations of war or armed conflict, with perpetrators using violence against the genitals of men, women, and non-binary people. These different forms of sexual violence can terrorize targeted individuals and communities, prevent individuals from reproducing, and cause tremendous pain and psychological anguish for victims.

Females

Female genital mutilation

Female genital mutilation (FGM), also known as female genital cutting (FGC), female circumcision, or female genital mutilation/cutting (FGM/C), refers to "all procedures involving partial or total removal of the external female genitalia or other surgery of the female genital organs whether for cultural, religious or other non-therapeutic reasons." It is not the same as the procedures used in gender reassignment surgery or the genital modification of intersex persons. It is practised in several parts of the world, but the practice is concentrated more heavily in Africa, parts of the Middle East, and some other parts of Asia. Over 125 million women and girls have experienced FGM in the 29 countries in which it is concentrated.

Over eight million have been infibulated, a practice found largely in Djibouti, Eritrea, Somalia and Sudan. Infibulation, the most extreme form of FGM (known as Type III), consists of the removal of the inner and outer labia and closure of the vulva, while a small hole is left for the passage of urine and menstrual blood; afterwards the vagina will be opened after the wedding for sexual intercourse and childbirth (see episiotomy). In the past several decades, efforts have been made by global health organizations, such as the WHO, to end the practice. FGM is condemned by international human rights organizations. The Istanbul Convention prohibits FGM (Article 38).

FGM is also considered a form of violence against women by the Declaration on the Elimination of Violence Against Women, which was adopted by the United Nations in 1993; it states: "Article Two: Violence against women shall be understood to encompass, but not be limited to, the following: (a) Physical, sexual and psychological violence occurring in the family, including ... female genital mutilation ...". However, because of its importance in traditional life, it continues to be practised in many societies.

Hymenorrhaphy

Hymenorrhaphy refers to the practice of thickening the hymen, or, in some cases, implanting a capsule of red liquid within the newly created vaginal tissue. This new hymen is created to cause physical resistance, blood, or the appearance of blood, at the time that the individual's new husband inserts his penis into her vagina. This is done in cultures where a high value is placed on female virginity at the time of marriage. In these cultures, a woman may be punished, perhaps violently, if the community leaders deem that she was not virginal at the time of consummation of her marriage. Individuals who are victims of rape, who were virginal at the time of their rape, may elect for hymenorrhaphy.

Labia stretching

Labia stretching is the act of elongating the labia minora through manual manipulation (pulling) or physical equipment (such as weights). It is a familial cultural practice in Rwanda, common in Sub-Saharan Africa, and a body modification practice elsewhere. It is performed for sexual enhancement of both partners, aesthetics, symmetry and gratification.

Labiaplasty and vaginoplasty

Cosmetic surgery of female genitalia, known as elective genitoplasty, has become pejoratively known as "designer vagina". In May 2007, an article published in the British Medical Journal strongly criticised this craze, citing its popularity being rooted in commercial and media influences. Similar concerns have been expressed in Australia.

Some women undergo vaginoplasty or labiaplasty procedures to alter the shape of their vulvas to meet personal or societal aesthetic standards. The surgery itself is controversial, and critics refer to the procedures as "designer vagina".

In the article Designer Vaginas by Simone Weil Davis, she talks about the modification of woman's vagina and the outside influences women are pressured with, which can cause them to feel shame towards their labia minora. She states that the media, such as pornography, creates an unhealthy view of what a "good looking vagina" is and how women feel that their privates are inferior and are therefore pressured to act upon that mindset. These insecurities are forced upon women by their partners and other women as well. Also leading to a surge of these types of procedures is increased interest in non-surgical genital alterations, such as Brazilian waxing, that make the vulva more visible to judgment. The incentive to participate in labia- and vaginoplasty may also come about in an effort to manage women's physical attributes and their sexual behavior, treating their vagina as something needing to be managed or controlled and ultimately deemed "acceptable".

Clitoral hood reduction 

Clitoral hood reduction is a form of hoodplasty. When performed with the consent of the adult individual, it can be considered an elective plastic surgery procedure for reducing the size and the area of the clitoral hood (prepuce) in order to further expose the clitoral glans of the clitoris; the therapeutic goal is thought to improve the sexual functioning of the woman, and the aesthetic appeal of her vulva. The reduction of the clitoral prepuce tissues usually is a sub-ordinate surgery within a labiaplasty procedure for reducing the labia minora; and occasionally within a vaginoplasty procedure. When these procedures are performed on individuals without their consent, they are considered a form of female genital mutilation.

Males

Castration

Castration in the genital modification and mutilation context is the removal of the testicles. Occasionally the term is also used to refer to penis removal, but that is less common. Castration has been performed in many cultures throughout history, but is now rare. It should not be confused with chemical castration.

Hemi-castration
The removal of one testicle (sometimes referred to as unilateral castration) is usually done in the modern world only for medical reasons.

Circumcision

Circumcision is the surgical removal of part or all of the foreskin from the penis. It is usually performed for religious, cultural or medical reasons and leaves some or all of the glans permanently exposed. Jews and many Americans typically have their infants circumcised during the neonatal period, while Filipinos, most Muslims and African communities such as the Maasai and Xhosa circumcise in teenage years or childhood as an initiation into adulthood.

In modern medicine, circumcision may be used as treatment for severe phimosis or recurrent balanitis that has not responded to more conservative treatments. Advocacy is often centered on preventive medicine, while opposition is often centered on human rights (particularly the bodily integrity of the infant when circumcision is performed in the neonatal period) and the potentially harmful side effects of the procedure. Neonatal circumcision is generally safe when done by an experienced practitioner, with complications being rare, though death has been reported in some cases.

The World Health Organization estimates that one third of the world's men are circumcised; the majority of circumcised male population is located in Muslim countries and in the United States, although there are various explanations for why the infant circumcision rate in the US is different from comparable countries.

In 2012, the American Academy of Pediatrics stated that health benefits of non-therapeutic circumcision were not great enough to recommend it for every newborn, that the benefits outweighed the risks, and that the procedure may be done for families who choose it.

The Danish College of General Practitioners has defined non-medical circumcision as mutilation.

Foreskin restoration

Foreskin restoration is the partial recreation of the foreskin after its removal by circumcision. Surgical restoration involves grafting skin taken from the scrotum onto a portion of the penile shaft. Nonsurgical methods involve tissue expansion by stretching the penile skin forward over the glans penis with the aid of tension. Nonsurgical restoration is the preferred method as it is less costly and typically yields better results than surgical restoration. A foreskin restoration device may be of help to men pursuing nonsurgical foreskin restoration. While restoration cannot recreate the nerves or tissues lost to circumcision, it can recreate the appearance and some of the function of a natural foreskin.

Infibulation

Infibulation literally means "to close with a clasp or a pin". The word is used to include suturing of the foreskin over the head of the penis.

Infibulation is seen in rock art in Southern Africa.

Early Greek infibulation consisted of piercing the foreskin and applying a gold, silver or bronze ring (annulus), a metal clasp (fibula) or pin. This was done for aesthetic reasons. Infibulation in Romano-Greek culture is attested as early as Aulus Cornelius Celcus (25 BC–50 AD) and as late as Oribasisus (325–405 AD).

In the Victorian era, both in the UK and in the United States, routine infibulation was second only to circumcision in the "war on masturbation" and was used in orphanages and mental institutions, supported by leading physicians.

In modern times, male infibulation may be performed for personal preferences or as part of BDSM.

Emasculation

Also known as total castration or nullification, emasculation is the combination of castration and penectomy.

Due to the high risk of death from bleeding and infection, it was often considered a punishment equivalent to a death sentence. It was part of the eunuch-making of the Chinese court, and it was widespread in the Arab slave trade. A castrated slave was worth more, and this offset the losses from death.

Nullification is the term used by the modern body modification community to describe the procedure of emasculation. "Nullo" is the term used to describe those who have undergone nullification.

In modern-day South Asia, some members of hijra communities reportedly undergo emasculation. It is called nirwaan and seen as a rite of passage.

Pearling

Pearling or genital beading is a form of body modification, the practice of permanently inserting small beads made of various materials beneath the skin of the genitals—of the labia, or of the shaft or foreskin of the penis. As well as being an aesthetic practice, this is usually intended to enhance the sexual pleasure of the receptive partner(s) during vaginal or anal intercourse.

Penectomy

Penectomy involves the partial or total amputation of penis. Sometimes, the removal of the entire penis was done in conjunction with castration, or incorrectly referred to as castration. Removing the penis was often performed on eunuchs and high ranking men who would frequently be in contact with women, such as those belonging to a harem. The hijra of India may remove their penis as an expression of their gender identity. In the medical field, removal of the penis may be performed for reasons of gangrene or cancer. Penis removal may occur through unintentional genital injury, such as during routine neonatal circumcision mishaps.

In the ulwaluko circumcision ceremony, which is performed by spear, accidental penectomy is a serious risk.

Penis removal for purposes of assault or revenge is overwhelmingly a female-on-male crime, particularly in Thailand. In the United States In 1907 Bertha Boronda sliced off her husband's penis with a straight razor. Lorena Bobbit infamously removed her husband's penis in 1993. In some circumstances it may be possible to reattach the penis.

Penile subincision

Penile subincision is a form of genital modification involves a urethrotomy and vertically slitting the underside of the penis from the meatus towards to the base. It was performed by people of some cultures, such as the Indigenous Australians, the Arrente, the Luritja, the Samburu, the Samoans, and the Native Hawaiians. It may also be performed for personal preference. Penile subincision may leave a man with an increased risk of sexually transmitted diseases, issues with fertility (due to lack of control over what direction the sperm goes after ejaculation), and may require a man to sit down while urinating. When the surgery is not performed in a hospital or by a licensed medical professional, complications such as infection, exsanguination, or permanent damage are major concerns.

Penile superincision 

A rectal slit (also known as superincision) is an incision made along the upper length of the foreskin with the intention to expose the glans penis without removing skin or tissue.

The practice appears to have occurred in Ancient Egypt, though not commonly:

It may be performed as a part of traditional customs, such as those in the Pacific Islands and the Philippines. In the medical field, it may be performed for as an alternative to circumcision when circumcision is undesired or impractical. It remains a rare surgery and practice overall.

See also 
Children's rights
Gishiri cutting
Violence against men
Violence against women
Emasculation

References

External links 

 The Geography of Genital Mutilations
 A world without female Genital Mutilation

 
Mutilation

fi:Naisten sukupuolielinten silpominen
sv:Könsstympning